Włodzimierz Zakrzewski (1916–1992) was a Polish painter, graphician and poster artist. He was a professor of Academy of Fine Arts in Warsaw, founder and director of Front Poster Studio of Ludowe Wojsko Polskie (1944–1948), member of the Group of Realists (Grupa Realistów).

Zakrzewski was an author of sociopolitical posters, landscape paintings (especially city landscapes of Warsaw and Paris) and figural compositions. He was a co-initiator of socialist realism in Polish painting and poster.

Notable works includes Olbrzym i zapluty karzeł reakcji (also known as AK. Zapluty karzeł reakcji; 1945), Towarzysz Bierut wśród robotników (1950), Wkraczamy w plan 6 letni [We are entering the Six-Year Plan] (1950), Partia [The Party] (1955).

See also
 Socialist realism in Poland

References

External links
 
 
 

1916 births
1992 deaths
Polish graphic designers
20th-century Polish painters
20th-century Polish male artists
Polish poster artists
Post-Impressionist artists
Post-impressionist painters
Academic staff of the Academy of Fine Arts in Warsaw
Polish male painters